Asperisporium caricae is an ascomycete fungus that is a plant pathogen, found in North and South America. It is responsible for the black spot disease on papaya trees. It affects generally leaves and fruits at any time.  Sporodochia of Asperisporium caricae was growing under side of leaf, dark blackish brown to black, stroma well-developed, erumpent.

References

 C. J. R. Cumagun and C. L. Padilla. First record of Asperisporium caricae causing black spot of papaya in the Philippines. Australasian Plant Disease Notes, 2007, 2, 89–90.
 Shantamma, S.G. Mantur, S.C. Chandrashekar, K.T. Rangaswamy and Bheemanagouda Patil. Review Article: Status of Black Spot of Papaya (Asperisporium caricae): A New Emerging Disease.International Journal of Current Microbiology and Applied Sciences ISSN: 2319-7706 Volume 7 Number 11 (2018)Journal homepage: http://www.ijcmas.com.

External links
  USDA ARS Fungal Database]
 Black Spot of Papaya Disease
 

Capnodiales
Fungal fruit diseases
Papaya tree diseases
Fungi of North America
Fungi of South America
Fungi described in 1886